The Abrams (formerly The Abrams Brothers) are a Canadian country band composed of fourth-generation musicians John Abrams and James Abrams. They have performed with acts such as John Hammond, Feist, Dean Brody, The Dixie Chicks, Nitty Gritty Dirt Band, and Luke Combs.

Biography
The Abrams have been performing together since John was 11 and James was 9. In 2005, the group was named Emerging Artist of the Year at the Canadian Bluegrass Music Awards. In 2006, they received the Daniel Pearl Memorial Violin. The Abrams Brothers at age 12 and 15, were the youngest Canadian duo to play the esteemed Grand Ole Opry stage in Nashville, Tennessee.

The Abrams released a Bob Dylan and Arlo Guthrie tribute album entitled Blue On Brown in 2009. Arlo Guthrie responded to the record by saying the band was "way too young to be playing that good. I know I will be hearing from The Abrams Brothers for a long time to come."

The band released their first album of original material Northern Redemption in 2011 on Fontana North/United For Opportunity. The album was produced by Canadian singer-songwriter/producer Chris Brown formerly of The Bourbon Tabernacle Choir, whose credits include The Barenaked Ladies, Ani DiFranco, and Tony Scherr.

The Abrams have been involved in many community service projects in their hometown of Kingston, Ontario, including the Robinson Community Garden, which supplies the local Salvation Army, Boys and Girls Club, and Martha's Table. In spring 2012 they launched the Musicville Ontario initiative, in which they donated $1000 to a local music education charity.

The Abrams released their major label debut EP on May 20, 2016, via Warner Music Canada. The EP was produced by Gavin Brown at Noble Street Studios in Toronto, Ontario. The first single from the album, "Fine" was released April of that year. The album earned the band a CMAO win for Roots Artist/Group of the Year.

On May 15, 2019, The Abrams released a brand new single, "Sounds Good To Me," produced by Matt Rovey, who has worked with Zac Brown Band and Alan Jackson. A new collection of music will be released later in 2019.

Members
John Abrams – vocals, guitar
James Abrams – vocals, violin

Discography

Albums

Studio albums

Extended plays

Singles

Music videos

Awards and nominations

References

Canadian folk music groups
Family musical groups
Canadian country music groups
Musical groups from Kingston, Ontario
Musical groups with year of establishment missing